Challenge Aero is a business aviation airline based in Kyiv, Ukraine established in 2002. It operates charter flights within Ukraine and to neighbouring CIS countries.

Fleet 
The Challenge Aero fleet consists of the following aircraft (at February 2016):

 Beechcraft Premier I
 Bombardier Learjet 60XR
 Bombardier Challenger 300
 Bombardier Challenger 605
 Bombardier Challenger 850
 Bombardier Global 5000
 Bombardier Global Express XRS
 Cessna Citation Bravo
 Cessna Citation CJ2+
 Cessna Citation CJ3
 Cessna Citation XLS
 Cessna Citation Sovereign
 Cessna Citation X
 Cessna Citation CJ3
 Falcon 900
 Falcon 2000
 Falcon 7X
 Gulfstream G100
 Gulfstream G150
 Gulfstream G200
 Gulfstream G550
 Embraer Legacy 600
 Hawker 850 XP

Helicopters
 AgustaWestland AW109
2 Bell 430
 Eurocopter EC120
2 Eurocopter EC135
  Eurocopter EC155

References

External links
Official website 

Airlines of Ukraine
Airlines established in 2002
Ukrainian companies established in 2002